Rafael Alejandro Olave Anabalón (born 10 May 1995) is a Chilean former footballer who played as a forward for clubs in Chile and Mexico.

Career
As a youth player, Olave was with Deportes Temuco and Universidad Católica, with whom he won some youth championships such as XXI Torneo Internacional de Fútbol Infantil and Apertura Fútbol Joven 2013, before joining Unión Española, making appearances for the B-team in the Segunda División Profesional de Chile.

From 2015 to 2016, he had a stint with Mexican side Santos Laguna.

Back in Chile, he joined Coquimbo Unido in 2017. After a year as a free agent, he played for Deportivo Pilmahue in 2019.

Controversies

References

External links
 
 

1995 births
Living people
People from Temuco
Chilean footballers
Chilean expatriate footballers
Unión Española footballers
Coquimbo Unido footballers
Santos Laguna footballers
Chilean Primera División players
Segunda División Profesional de Chile players
Liga MX players
Primera B de Chile players
Chilean expatriate sportspeople in Mexico
Expatriate footballers in Mexico
Association football forwards